Kirk David Edward Stewart (born 1 January 1974) is an English former cricketer. Born in Rhodesia (today Zimbabwe), Stewart was a right-handed batsman who bowled arm fast-medium.

Stewart made his List-A debut for the Hampshire Cricket Board in the 1999 NatWest Trophy against the Suffolk. Stewart played in a further two matches in the tournament against Shropshire and Glamorgan County Cricket Club. In his brief List-A career Stewart took seven wickets at an average of 18.71, with best figures of 3/52 coming on debut against Suffolk.

In the same season Stewart played seven matches for the Hampshire Second XI. In 2001 Stewart played for Hertfordshire in two matches against Suffolk and Buckinghamshire in the Minor Counties Championship.

External links
Kirk Stewart at Cricinfo
Kirk Stewart at CricketArchive

1974 births
Living people
People from Marondera
English cricketers
Hampshire Cricket Board cricketers
Hertfordshire cricketers